Prof. Vicki Chen  is an Australian engineer, and the Executive Dean for the Faculty of Engineering, Architecture and Information Technology at the University of Queensland. In 2020 she was elected as the Fellow of Australian Academy of Technology and Engineering.

Chen was inspired to pursue engineering by her father, who also worked as a chemical engineer, viewing a path in engineering as "a career that could take [her] around the world and allow [her] to work in a wide variety of industries."

Chen received a Bachelor of Engineering degree from MIT, and went on to undertake her PhD in chemical engineering from the University of Minnesota in the area of surfactant self-assembly, including early work on microemulsion systems.

In recent years, Chen's research has focused on membrane science and engineering, with specific focus on nanocomposite membranes, fouling and advanced separations. This has facilitated a number of industry collaborations with partners including BASF, Dairy Innovation Australia, Australian Low Emission Coal R&D, Bluescope Steel, Coal Innovation NSW, Beijing OriginWater Technology, Printed Energy, and Sydney Water.

Chen is a prolific and highly cited engineer, having published more than 175 papers that have been cited >14,000 times, giving her an H-index of 64.

Chen spent nearly 30 years at UNSW in Sydney, Australia, going on to hold a number of senior administrative positions in research and higher education. She has been a full Professor since 2008, and acted as Head of the School of Chemical Engineering from 2014 to 2018. She was previously director of the UNESCO Centre for Membrane Science and Technology, at UNSW from 2006 to 2014.

Since August 2018, Chen has been the Executive Dean for the Faculty of Engineering, Architecture and Information Technology at the University of Queensland, where she seeks to foster "a culture and ecosystem where our researchers and academics can flourish and contribute to the global thought leadership of their disciplines as well as translating the outcomes of their work to the wider community."

References

Australian women engineers
Living people
Year of birth missing (living people)
Academic staff of the University of Queensland
MIT School of Engineering alumni
University of Minnesota College of Science and Engineering alumni
21st-century women engineers